The 1920 United States Senate election in South Dakota took place on November 2, 1920. Incumbent Democratic Senator Edwin S. Johnson declined to seek re-election to a second term. In the Democratic primary, attorney Ulysses Simpson Grant Cherry defeated former State Senator Louis Napoleon Crill and former U.S. Marshal Tom Taubman, while in the Republican primary, Governor Peter Norbeck defeated former State Supreme Court Justice Dick Haney. In the general election, Cherry and Norbeck faced a litany of independent candidates, including Nonpartisan League candidate Tom Ayres. Benefiting from the split in left-wing candidates, Norbeck won by a wide margin, with Ayres narrowly beating out Cherry for second place.

Democratic Primary

Candidates
 Ulysses Simpson Grant Cherry, Sioux Falls attorney
 Louis Napoleon Crill, former President Pro Tempore of the State Senate
 Tom Taubman, former U.S. Marshal for the District of South Dakota

Results

Republican Primary

Candidates
 Peter Norbeck, Governor of South Dakota
 Dick Haney, former South Dakota Supreme Court Justice

Results

General election

Results

References

South Dakota
1920
1920 South Dakota elections